Military History (stylized as MILITARY HISTORY) is an American pay television channel owned by A&E Networks. The channel features programs about the history of the military and significant combat events. The channel's main competitor is Warner Bros. Discovery's American Heroes Channel, formerly the Military Channel.

History
Military History was launched on January 5, 2005, and as the third spin-off channel of History. Viewers of History wanted more military history programs, but there was not time on the channel, thus the creation of Military History. Beginning on March 27, 2004, a military-history programming block started on History International as a prologue. The launch was an open preview, or soft launch, as no cable operators were signed up. Dan Davids, president of the History Channel USA, planned to push for digital basic level cable carriage. Its initial programming library drew from A&E and History's programs. The channel's initial prime time shows were under an umbrella banner of “Battle History”, which consisted of five documentary miniseries featuring each of the US military services. In the second quarter of 2005, the channel had its hard launch.

Like its parent channel, the channel dropped the word "Channel" from its name on March 20, 2008.

Programming
Military History features programs that focus on historical battles and wars, as well as programs that profile key individuals such as generals, soldiers and spies. It also airs documentaries and series that provide insight into how these wars were fought and the lives of those who served in them.

Its initial programming library drew from A&E and History's program libraries. Much of its programming focuses on World War II; this same type of programming had earned The History Channel the appellation "The Hitler Channel" up until the transfer of these programs to Military History.  Additionally, their film library uses a great deal of filler simply because there wasn’t footage to cover the action. (e.g. showing soldiers when subject is Marines.)

Programming banners
 “Battle History” (January 5, 2005) which consisted of five documentary miniseries featuring the US military services and was the channel's soft launch prime time programming
 “Salute to Armed Forces Week”, included the specials, “Hispanics & the Medal of Honor”, “America’s Black Warriors”, “Women Combat Pilots” and “Clash of Warriors: Saddam vs. Schwarzkopf”

List of programs
 Conspiracy?
 Dogfights
 The Eastern Front: The Gates of Moscow
 The Eastern Front: Turning Point at Stalingrad
 Free Cabanatuan
 Greatest Raids
 Greatest Tank Battles
 Hitler's Collaborators
 Hitler's War: The Lost
 Inside the Great Battles
 The Kamikaze
 The Last Days of WWII
 Lock N' Load with R. Lee Ermey
 Mail Call
 Okinawa!
 Pacific: The Lost Evidence
 President Lincoln Assassination
 Survival Training
 Surviving the Cut
 Tactical to Practical
 Triggers: Weapons That Changed the World
 The Unholy Battle for Rome
 Warriors
 Weaponology

International
In addition to its carriage in the United States, the channel had previously been launched in the United Kingdom and Ireland on July 28, 2008. On March 20, 2010, Military History was added to Virgin Media on channel 236. Military History was replaced by its sister network, H2, in those countries on May 4, 2013, on both Sky and Virgin Media in Military History's former channel slots on both platforms.

References

A&E Networks
English-language television stations in the United States
Television channels and stations established in 2005
Works about the military
Television channels and networks about history
2005 establishments in the United States